The 1994–95 season was the 93rd season in which Dundee competed at a Scottish national level, playing in the Scottish First Division after being relegated the previous season. Dundee would finish in 3rd place and miss out a chance for promotion by goal difference. Dundee would also compete in both the Scottish League Cup and the Scottish Cup, where they were knocked out by Celtic in the 3rd round of the League Cup, and by Raith Rovers in the 4th round of the Scottish Cup. They would also compete in the Scottish Challenge Cup and would reach the final, before being defeated by Airdrieonians.

Scottish First Division 

Statistics provided by Dee Archive.

League table

Scottish League Cup 

Statistics provided by Dee Archive.

Scottish Cup 

Statistics provided by Dee Archive.

Scottish Challenge Cup 

Statistics provided by Dee Archive.

Player statistics 
Statistics provided by Dee Archive

|}

See also 

 List of Dundee F.C. seasons

References

External links 

 1994–95 Dundee season on Fitbastats

Dundee F.C. seasons
Dundee